E-Team is a 2014 American documentary film co-directed and produced by Katy Chevigny and Ross Kauffman. The film premiered in the competition category of U.S. Documentary Competition program at the 2014 Sundance Film Festival on January 18, 2014. Rachel Beth Anderson and Ross Kauffman won the Cinematography Award: U.S. Documentary at the festival, as well as the Candescent Award.

Synopsis
The film narrates the story of four members of the Emergencies Team, investigating and reporting the human rights abuse across the globe.

Reception
The film received positive response from critics. 
Rob Nelson in his review for Variety said that "The valiant and vital work of four globetrotting human rights activists is expertly illuminated in 'E-Team', a dynamic and immersive piece of you-are-there verite." 
Duane Byrge of The Hollywood Reporter gave the film a positive review and said that "In this spellbinding story, filmmakers Katy Chevigny and Ross Kauffman thrust us into the red-alert lives of four E-Team members. It's a comprehensive portrayal of these people's personal and professional lives. We see what makes them tick. Are they adrenaline junkies? Thrill-seekers? Not at all." 
Carlos Aguilar from Indiewire in his review said that "Powerful and shocking but with enough humanity from its subjects to add tender moments of hope, the "E-Team" is a fascinating look at how information can be the most effective tool to avoid indifference."

References

External links
Official website

2014 films
American documentary films
2014 documentary films
Sundance Film Festival award winners
Documentary films about human rights
Netflix original documentary films
Cultural depictions of Slobodan Milošević
Films directed by Ross Kauffman
2010s English-language films
2010s American films